The Davis County springsnail, scientific name Pyrgulopsis davisi, is a species of small freshwater snails with a gill and an operculum, aquatic gastropod mollusk in the family Hydrobiidae.

This species' natural habitat is streams.

Description
Its differentiated from other Pyrgulopsis in that its penial filament has a medium length lobe and medium length filament with the penial ornament consisting of an elongate, proximally bifurcate, penial gland; curved, transverse terminal and ventral glands.

References

Pyrgulopsis
Molluscs of the United States
Gastropods described in 1987
Taxonomy articles created by Polbot